Allen Jay School Rock Gymnasium is a historic gymnasium building located at High Point, Guilford County, North Carolina. It was built in 1938-1939 as part of a Works Progress Administration (WPA) project at a rural consolidated school. It is a two-story, Rustic Revival-style fieldstone  building.  It has two small, one-story additions.

It was listed on the National Register of Historic Places in 2012.

References

Buildings and structures in High Point, North Carolina
Works Progress Administration in North Carolina
Sports venues on the National Register of Historic Places in North Carolina
Sports venues completed in 1939
Sports venues in Guilford County, North Carolina
National Register of Historic Places in Guilford County, North Carolina
1939 establishments in North Carolina
Sports in the Piedmont Triad